Francis Reginald Scott  (1899–1985), commonly known as Frank Scott or F. R. Scott, was a lawyer, Canadian poet, intellectual, and constitutional scholar. He helped found the first Canadian social democratic party, the Co-operative Commonwealth Federation, and its successor, the New Democratic Party. He won Canada's top literary prize, the Governor General's Award, twice, once for poetry and once for non-fiction. He was married to artist Marian Dale Scott.

Life and work
Scott was born on August 1, 1899, in Quebec City, the sixth of seven children. His father was Frederick George Scott, "an Anglican priest, minor poet and staunch advocate of the civilizing tradition of imperial Britain, who instilled in his son a commitment to serve mankind, a love for the regenerative balance of the Laurentian landscape and a firm respect for the social order." He witnessed the riots in the city during the Conscription Crisis of 1917.

Completing his undergraduate studies at Bishop's University, in Lennoxville, Quebec, Scott went to Magdalen College, Oxford, as a Rhodes Scholar and was influenced by the Christian socialist ideas of R. H. Tawney and the Student Christian Movement.

Scott returned to Canada, settled in Montreal, studied law at McGill University, and eventually joined the law faculty as a professor. While at McGill, Scott became a member of the Montreal Group of modernist poets, a circle that also included Leon Edel, John Glassco, and A. J. M. Smith.
Scott and Smith became lifelong friends. Scott contributed to the McGill Daily Literary Supplement, which Smith edited; when that folded in 1925, he and Smith founded and edited the McGill Fortnightly Review. After the Review folded, Scott helped found and briefly co-edited The Canadian Mercury. Scott, assisted by Smith and Leo Kennedy, also anonymously edited the modernist poetry anthology New Provinces (in which he published ten poems), which was published in 1936.

The Great Depression greatly disturbed Scott; he and the historian Frank Underhill founded the League for Social Reconstruction (LSR) to advocate socialist solutions in a Canadian context. Through the LSR, Scott became an influential figure in the Canadian socialist movement. He was a founding member of the Co-operative Commonwealth Federation (CCF) and a contributor to that party's Regina Manifesto. He also edited a book advocating Social Planning for Canada (1935). In 1943, he co-authored Make This Your Canada, spelling out the CCF national programme, with David Lewis. Scott was elected national chairman of the CCF in 1942, and would serve until 1950.

In March 1942 Scott co-founded a literary magazine, Preview, with the Montreal poet Patrick Anderson. Like the earlier Montreal Group publications, "Preview orientation was cosmopolitan; its members looked largely towards the English poets of the 1930s for inspiration."

In 1950–1951 Scott cofounded Recherches sociales, a study group concerned with the French–English relationship. He began translating French-Canadian poetry.

In 1952 he served as a United Nations technical assistance resident representative in Burma to help build a socialist state in that country.

During the 1950s, Scott was an active opponent of the Duplessis regime in Quebec and went to court to fight the Padlock Law. He also represented Frank Roncarrelli, a Jehovah's Witness, in Roncarelli v Duplessis all the way to the Supreme Court of Canada, a battle that Maurice Duplessis lost.

Scott began translating French-Canadian poetry, publishing Anne Hébert and Saint-Denys Garneau in 1962. He edited Poems of French Canada (1977), which won the Canada Council prize for translation.

Scott served as dean of law at McGill University from 1961 to 1964 and served on the Royal Commission on Bilingualism and Biculturalism. In 1970 he was offered a seat in the Senate of Canada by Pierre Trudeau. Although he declined the appointment, he supported Trudeau's imposition of the War Measures Act during the October Crisis same year.

Scott opposed Quebec's Bill 22 and Bill 101, which established the province within its jurisdiction as an officially-unilingual province within an officially-bilingual country.

After his death on January 30, 1985, Scott was interred in Mount Royal Cemetery, Montreal.

Recognition
Scott won the 1977 Governor General's Award for non-fiction for his Essays on the Constitution and the 1981 Governor General's Award for poetry for his Collected Poems.

The Royal Society of Canada elected Scott a fellow in 1947, and awarded him its Lorne Pierce Medal in 1962.

Scott won the Molson Prize in 1965.

In 1966, Scott received an honorary doctorate from Sir George Williams University, which later became Concordia University.

Leonard Cohen added music to Scott's villanelle, "A Villanelle for Our Time", and recorded it on his album Dear Heather.

Scott is the subject of a number of critical works, as well as a major biography, The Politics of the Imagination: A Life of F. R. Scott by Sandra Djwa.

Publications

Poetry
 Overture. Toronto: Ryerson Press, 1945.
Events and Signals. Toronto: Ryerson Press, 1954.
The Eye of the Needle: Satire, Sorties, Sundries. Montreal: Contact Press, 1957.
Signature. Vancouver: Klanak Press, 1964.
Selected Poems. Toronto: Oxford University Press, 1966.
Trouvailles: Poems from Prose. Montreal: Delta Canada, 1967.
The Dance Is One. Toronto: McClelland and Stewart, 1973.
The Collected Poems of F. R. Scott. Toronto: McClelland and Stewart, 1981.

Translations
St-Denys Garneau & Anne Hebert: Translations/Traductions. Translated by F. R. Scott. Vancouver: Klanak Press, 1962.
Poems of French Canada. Translated by F. R. Scott. Burnaby, BC: Blackfish Press, 1977.

Except where indicated, bibliographical information on poetry courtesy of Canadian Poetry Online.

Non-fiction
Social Reconstruction and the B.N.A. Act – 1934
Labour Conditions in the Men's Clothing Industry – 1935 (with H. M. Cassidy)
Social Planning for Canada – 1935.
Canada Today: A Study of Her National Interests and National Policy – 1938
Canada's Role in World Affairs – 1942
Make This Your Canada: A Review of C.C.F. History and Policy – 1943 (with David Lewis)
Cooperation for What? United States and British Commonwealth – 1944
The World War Against Poverty – 1953 (with R. A. MacKay and A. E. Ritchie)
What Does Labour Need in a Bill of Rights – 1959
The Canadian Constitution and Human Rights – 1959
Civil Liberties and Canadian Federalism – 1959
Dialogue sur la traduction – 1970 (with Anne Hebert)
Essays on the Constitution: Aspects of Canadian Law and Politics – 1977

Edited
New Provinces: Poems of Several Authors (with A. J. M. Smith and Leo Kennedy). Toronto: Macmillan, 1936.
The Blasted Pine: An Anthology of Satire, Invective and Disrespectful Verse – 1957 (with A. J. M. Smith)

Discography
 Six Montreal Poets. New York: Folkways Records, 1957. Includes A. J. M. Smith, Leonard Cohen, Irving Layton, F. R. Scott, Louis Dudek, and A. M. Klein. (cassette, 60 mins)
Canadian Poets on Tape. Toronto: Ontario Institute for Studies in Education, 1969, 1971. (cassette, 30 mins)
A Poetry Reading. Toronto: League of Canadian Poets, 1982. (cassette, 60 mins)
Celebration: Famous Canadian Poets CD London, Ontario: Canadian Poetry Association — 1999   (CD#4) (with James Reaney )

Except where noted, discographical information courtesy Canadian Poetry Online.

See also
List of Bishop's College School alumni

References

External links

University of Calgary biography
Canadian Poetry Online: F.R. Scott  – 6 poems (Lakeshore, Laurentian Shield, The Canadian Authors Meet, A Grain of Rice, W.L.M.K., Resurrection)
 http://www.library.utoronto.ca/canpoetry/scott_fr/pub.htm 
Archives of F.R. Scott (Francis Reginald Scott fonds, R5822) are held at Library and Archives Canada

1899 births
1985 deaths
20th-century Canadian male writers
20th-century Canadian poets
Alumni of Magdalen College, Oxford
Anglican poets
Anglican socialists
Anglophone Quebec people
Bishop's University alumni
Burials at Mount Royal Cemetery
Canadian Anglicans
Canadian Christian socialists
Canadian male non-fiction writers
Canadian male poets
Canadian modernist poets
Bishop's College School alumni
Canadian King's Counsel
Canadian Rhodes Scholars
Co-operative Commonwealth Federation
Companions of the Order of Canada
Fellows of the American Academy of Arts and Sciences
Corresponding Fellows of the British Academy
Fellows of the Royal Society of Canada
Governor General's Award-winning non-fiction writers
Governor General's Award-winning poets
Lawyers in Quebec
McGill University Faculty of Law alumni
Academic staff of the McGill University Faculty of Law
Canadian scholars of constitutional law
Writers from Quebec City